UK Oil and Gas PLC (AIM: UKOG) is a UK-based oil and gas exploration and production company. The company is listed on the London Stock Exchange in the Alternative Investment Market (UKOG.L).

Company history

2013 to present
The company assumed its present name on 4 December 2013. The following day it changed its TIDM (ticker symbol) to UKOG.

In March 2016 UKOG made national news with the flow-testing of the Horse Hill 1 well (HH-1) three miles north of Gatwick Airport, achieving the highest flow rates of an onshore well in the UK. From three zones a combined flow rate of 1,688 barrels a day was achieved.

In 2017 the Broadford Bridge well (BB-1) and its associated sidetrack BB-1z were drilled. However, this project was less successful than HH-1, with complications involving blocked fractures in the well bore, which led to flow rates considered sub-commercial to date.

UKOG is currently performing an Extended Well Test at Horse Hill to identify whether the HH-1 well can be considered commercial, both from the Portland sandstone and the Kimmeridge limestone. The Portland has now been declared commercially viable and planning permission has been given for five additional wells at the Horse Hill site, with a goal of about 3,200 barrels of oil a day, which, if achieved, would make it the second-largest land-based oil production site in the UK.

Operations in the United Kingdom
UKOG currently has interests in seven oil and gas assets in the South of England through a mixture of exploration licences and a few ageing production fields.

Weald Basin
The majority of UKOG's current development and appraisal programme is in the Weald Basin, where its flagship assets at Horse Hill (Licence: PEDL137/PEDL246) and Broadford Bridge (Licence: PEDL234) are located. UKOG also has a 40 per cent interest in the Holmwood prospect, which is operated by Europa (oil company). Other exploration interests include Arreton (Isle of Wight) (PEDL331) and Markwells Wood (PEDL126). UKOG has two field in production that are operated by IGas Energy: Horndean (10 per cent interest) and Avington (5 per cent interest).

References

Oil and gas companies of the United Kingdom
British companies established in 2000
Companies listed on the London Stock Exchange
Energy companies established in 2000